The Freeze is an American punk rock band from Cape Cod, Massachusetts, United States, formed by a group of teenagers in 1978. They released the first single, "I Hate Tourists" in 1980 and contributed eight songs, including the title track to the 1982 hardcore punk compilation This Is Boston, Not L.A.

The band is known for their dark lyrics, original punk rock melodies, and their longevity.  A lot of their early lyrics deal with alienation, drug-use/abuse and paranoia (especially of the church, government and those exercising authority over others in general). A constant theme or thread regarding apathetic observers or people willing to give up their freedoms for fear of losing their "security" is also apparent in their work.

History
Influenced by The Ramones, The Clash and other early punk bands, Clif "Hanger" Croce put together The Freeze in 1978.  A friend scraped up enough cash the next year to make 2,000 copies of the band's debut single, "I Hate Tourists". According to a band history, “A Christian group tried to ban it. The Boston Phoenix voted it one of the top 10 local singles of the year. It was fun." "I Hate Tourists" was released in 1980.  The Freeze's music was picked by Newbury Comics' in-house label, Modern Method Records, which released several of the Freeze's songs on the Boston hardcore compilation albums Unsafe at Any Speed and This Is Boston, Not L.A. in 1982. The Freeze's title track for that album was used in a television commercial for Newbury Comics on local UHF music video station V66, with the song's penultimate word bleeped out. The band also re-recorded "No One's Ever Coming Home" for Flipside Vinyl Fanzine, Vol. 1, released by Gasatanka Records in 1984.

The 1983 album Land of the Lost and 1985's Rabid Reaction followed before Modern Method folded. The group was picked up by Taang! Records for their 1991 album, Misery Loves Company. The cover of their 1999 album, One False Move, featured fellow Cape Cod artist and author Edward Gorey.

Crawling Blind, an album released in 1994, told tales about people who were slaves to addiction. In 1996, Freak Show, "continued a downhill lyrical theme,” stated frontman Croce. He explored mental illness on songs such as "Creeping Psychosis" and "Suspended Heaven".

They released an album, One False Move, in March 1999.

After a twenty year gap The Freeze released another album called Calling All Creatures on Slope Records, in 2019.

Discography

Studio albums
Land of the Lost (1983)
Rabid Reaction (1985)
Misery Loves Company (1991)
Crawling Blind (1994)
Freak Show (1996)
One False Move (1999)
Calling All Creatures (2019)

Singles and EPs
"I Hate Tourists" (1980)
"Guilty Face EP" (1982) 
"PTP" (1991)
"Bloodlights" (1991)
"Welcome to Planet Earth" (1999)
"Blood Flows Home" CD-EP (2011)
"Someone's Bleeding" CD-EP (2015)

Split releases
The Freeze and Straw Dogs 7" (1991)
The Freeze and the Killrays CD (1995)
A Deadly Duo 10" (w/ the Bollweevils) (1996)

Compilation appearances
A Wicked Good Time: Vol. 2 (1981)
This Is Boston, Not L.A. (1982)
Unsafe at Any Speed (1983)
Life is a Joke vol. 3 (1987)
Revenge of the Kamikaze Stegosaurus From Outer Space (1988)
Boston Wolfpack (1999)

Live recordings
Five Way Fury LP (1992)
The Freeze 11/2/96 7" (1996)
Live at the Mill Hill Club in 1980 LP (2007)

Collections and reprints
Guilty Face + 3 10" EP (1991)
Double Dosed LP (1992)
Token Bones LP (1997)
Crawling Blind / Freak Show  (CD, 2004) (LP, 2013)

Members
Band founder, songwriter, and vocalist Clif "Hanger" Croce is the only member that has been in every incarnation of the band, which has seen many line-up changes.

Current members
Clif "Hanger" Croce – Vocals
Bill Close – Guitar, Vocals, Bass
Aaron Hjalmarson – Drums, Vocals

Former members

Queeny Curmudgeon Carmichael (AKA The Mudge-Man) – Guitar, Vocals, Yipping, High Octave Yodeling, and Legal Consultant   
Dave (DB) Barbee – Guitar, Vocals
Johnny Baxter – Drums
Rob (DeCradle) Rosenthal – Guitar
Pat Leonard – Bass
Eric Dewolf – Bass
Pat Brady – Drums
Paul Delano – Guitar
Scott Moulaison – Drums, Vocals
Steve Wood – Guitar
Shane Mackie – Guitar
Rick Andrews – Bass
Marc Thalasitas – Guitar, Vocals
Daniella Thalasitas – Bass
Craig Adams – Bass
Eric Short – Guitar
Joe Koonz – Guitar and Vocals
Ronald Cormier – Guitar
Kevin Vicha ("Kev") – Drums
Lou "Chip" Cataldo – Drums
Walter Gustafson – Drums
Chuck Stilphen – Guitar
Mark Leonard – Bass
Chris Barone – Drums
Mikey Jak – Bass
Anthony Pizzo – Guitar
Patrick "Swedish" Souza – Drums
Slade Anderson – Guitar
John – Guitar
Molusk – Bass Guitar
Jason Stone – Drums
Joshy Wastrel – Guitar, Vocals
Gizz Lazlo – Drums, Vocals
David Diamond – Guitar
Arvin Mani – Bass
Frank Anderson – Drums
Anthony Barbaria – Drums
Nick Govoni – Bass

References

External links
The official website of the Freeze on Myspace
The official website of Clif Hanger on Myspace
Scannerzine interview with Clif Hanger from August 2005
Schizophrenic records re-issued "I Hate Tourists" 7", the Guilty Face EP (with bonus tracks), and release the LP Live from Cape Cod 1980 
"Drink, Fight, and Fuck!" – A interview with the Freeze which will be part of the liner notes for the Live from Cape Cod 1980 LP

Hardcore punk groups from Massachusetts
Musical quintets
Musical groups established in 1978